The Coolcoulaghta Standing Stones are a pair of standing stones forming a stone row and National Monument located in County Cork, Ireland.

Location

History

The stones probably date to the Bronze Age period. It points towards Dunbeacon stone circle 400 m (¼ mile) to the west and the stones may have been used for astronomical observation.

They were removed in 1980 but the stones were replaced in 1983 by the Office of Public Works, after local outcry, using a plan and elevation made in 1977 by archaeologists of Ordnance Survey Ireland.

The purpose of standing stones is unclear; they may have served as boundary markers, ritual or ceremonial sites, burial sites or astrological alignments.

Description

The stones are both about 1.8 m (6 ft) tall.

A third stone once stood 63 m (70 yd) SSW of the pair; this has since been removed.

References

National Monuments in County Cork
Megalithic monuments in Ireland